The 1989–90 World Series was a One Day International (ODI) cricket tri-series where Australia played host to Pakistan and Sri Lanka. Australia and Pakistan reached the Finals, which Australia won 2–0. Sri Lanka wore royal blue for the first time in Australia.

Points table

Result summary

Final series
Australia won the best of three final series against Pakistan 2–0.

References

Australian Tri-Series
1989 in Australian cricket
1989 in Pakistani cricket
1989 in Sri Lankan cricket
1989–90 Australian cricket season
1990 in Australian cricket
1990 in Pakistani cricket
1990 in Sri Lankan cricket
International cricket competitions from 1988–89 to 1991
1989–90
1989–90